Barbara Czekalla (born 7 November 1951) is a German former volleyball player who competed for East Germany in the 1976 Summer Olympics and in the 1980 Summer Olympics.

She was born in Caputh.

In 1976 she was part of the East German team which finished sixth in the Olympic tournament. She played all five matches.

Four years later she won the silver medal with the East German team in the 1980 Olympic tournament. She played all five matches again.

References 

 

1951 births
Living people
People from Potsdam-Mittelmark
German women's volleyball players
Sportspeople from Brandenburg
Olympic volleyball players of East Germany
Volleyball players at the 1976 Summer Olympics
Volleyball players at the 1980 Summer Olympics
Olympic silver medalists for East Germany
Olympic medalists in volleyball
Medalists at the 1980 Summer Olympics
Recipients of the Patriotic Order of Merit in bronze
21st-century German women
20th-century German women